The Jbel Saghro or Djebel Sahrho is a mountain range in south- east Morocco. It is located south of the High Atlas and east of the Anti-Atlas in the northwest of Africa, northeast of Taliouine and southwest of Ouarzazate.

Geography
The Jbel Saghro is an eastern prolongation of the Anti-Atlas, separated from it by the valley of the Draâ. To the north of the range runs the valley of the Dadès, separating it from the massive High Atlas Range. 
 
Saɣru in the Tamazight language means drought, an apt name considering that the Jbel Saghro is the driest mountain area of the whole Atlas Mountain System. Since it is located in the inland side of the greater range this massif does not benefit from the Atlantic Ocean winds that bring humidity to the Anti-Atlas ranges further to the west as well as other ocean-facing ranges further north. Annual rainfall is only 100 mm in the southern slopes and 300 mm at the summits. However, the desolation of the harsh landscapes of the massive dry mountains with the many areas of bare rock and the austere, lunar beauty does not leave anyone unimpressed. Therefore these mountain area is popular with trekkers and adventure-tourists.

The highest summit of the range is 2,712 m high Amalou n'Mansour, located southeast of the village of Iknioun; other notable peaks are 2,592 m high Jbel Kouaouch, Jbel Afougal (2,196 m) and Jbel Amlal (2,447 m). One of the most important mountain passes of the range is the 2,283 m high Tizi n'Tazazert.
 
The Jbel Saghro area is a traditional region of the Aït Atta Berber tribe. It is sparsely inhabited, the only notable villages being N'Kob and Tazzarine. There are cave paintings in certain areas of the range.

Nomads 
The Jbel Saghro area is home to nomad families who spend their winters in the region. They are semi-nomadic and migrate to Ait Bougemez (Paradise Valley) in the summer with their flocks of sheep and goats, using camels, mules and donkeys to transport their belongings. Their numbers are dwindling as they move to more permanent bases to find a less difficult life and ensure that their children are educated.

Features

See also
Anti-Atlas
Dadès Gorges
Geography of Morocco

References

External links

Trekking across the Jbel Sarhro
Travelling through the Jbel Sarhro by mule

Mountain ranges of Morocco
Mountain ranges of the Atlas Mountains